{{DISPLAYTITLE:C10H20}}
The molecular formula C10H20 (molar mass: 140.26 g/mol, exact mass: 140.1565 u) may refer to:

 Cyclodecane
 Decene
 p-Menthane

Molecular formulas